This event is a part of the 2009 UCI Cyclo-cross World Championships in Hoogerheide, Netherlands and was held on Sunday February 1, 2009. It was Marianne Vos' second victory in the Women's Elite.

Ranking

Notes

External links
 Union Cycliste Internationale

Women's elite race
UCI Cyclo-cross World Championships – Women's elite race
2009 in cyclo-cross